South East Street Historic District is a national historic district located at Culpeper, Culpeper County, Virginia. It encompasses 76 contributing buildings in a residential section of the town of Culpeper.  The earliest houses date to the 1830s-1840s, with most built after 1870.  Notable buildings include the late Federal-style "Episcopal Rectory" (c. 1835), Old Hill House (c. 1840), Lawrence-Payne-Chelf House (1852), Old Waite House (1870-1871), and Crimora Waite House.  Also located in the district are the separately listed Hill Mansion and Culpeper National Cemetery.

It was listed on the National Register of Historic Places in 2009.

References

Historic districts on the National Register of Historic Places in Virginia
Federal architecture in Virginia
Georgian architecture in Virginia
Historic districts in Culpeper County, Virginia
National Register of Historic Places in Culpeper County, Virginia